Meet the Raisins! is a 1988 claymation television special directed by Barry Bruce, featuring the advertising characters The California Raisins. The show was broadcast November 4, 1988, on the U.S. television network CBS during primetime. It was the Raisins' second appearance in a primetime special and their first dedicated feature. Meet the Raisins! was followed by a sequel in 1990, Raisins: Sold Out! This special premiered after one of the This Is America, Charlie Brown specials.

For the first time, the California Raisins were given individual names and characterizations: A.C. Arborman (vocals), his younger brother Beebop Arborman (drums), their cousin Red Raisin (guitar/piano), and their friend Stamford "Stretch" Thompson (bass).

The 24-minute special shortly followed its similarly titled soundtrack album released on August 8, 1988 on Atlantic Records. Aired during the characters' peak in popularity, Meet the Raisins! is presented in a mockumentary style depicting the Raisins' musical career. It was nominated for the 1989 Primetime Emmy Award for Outstanding Animated Program.

Plot 
Meet the Raisins! spoofs musical documentaries with its use of anthropomorphic produce characters. Through its historical perspective, the special also provided an opportunity to elaborate on the personalities and introduce names of the simple yet popular characters. It follows the California Raisins' humble beginnings, rise to musical success, fall from stardom, and eventual comeback. This includes "home movie" clips, scenes of the group's early days as the Vine-Yls, concert footage, and interviews with the people behind the success of the California Raisins, including manager Rudy Bagaman. The group is also shown performing various hit songs.

Reception
The special gained praise for its witty, family-friendly humor, as well as its impressive clay animation, which was state-of-the-art at the time.

Award nominations
1989 Primetime Emmy Award nomination for Outstanding Animated Program

Soundtrack

Meet the Raisins! is the official soundtrack to the CBS television special of the same name. It consists of early rock & roll as well as R&B hits largely from the Motown era.

"I Heard It Through the Grapevine," the group's signature song, reached #84 on the Billboard Hot 100 in 1988. The soundtrack received praise from Allmusic's Peter Fawthrop who named it an AMG Album Pick.

Track listing
 "Signed, Sealed, Delivered I'm Yours" 	
 "Shotgun" 	
 "Green Onions"
 "Ain't Too Proud to Beg"
 "At the Hop"
 "Get a Job"
 "Cool Jerk"
 "Tears on My Pillow"
 "Tutti Frutti"
 "Papa Oom Mow Mow"
 "Sh-Boom"
 "I Heard It Through the Grapevine"

Chart positions

Singles

Releases
Meet the Raisins! was released on VHS on March 14, 1989. It was re-released on September 12, 1990 with a California Raisin plush doll.

The special was released on DVD November 15, 2011. Included in the set is the sequel to the claymation special, The Raisins: Sold Out!: The California Raisins II along with all 13 episodes of the animated series, The California Raisin Show and 4 original TV ads.

The Raisins Sold Out!: The California Raisins II

The Raisins Sold Out!: The California Raisins II is a 1990 claymation television special directed by Will Vinton, featuring the advertising characters The California Raisins. The show was broadcast August 29, 1990, on the U.S. television network CBS during primetime. It was the sequel to the Emmy-nominated special Meet the Raisins! in 1988.

This special has the band hiring a slick-talking new manager, Leonard Limabean, in an attempt to make a comeback. Under his guidance, the Raisins try their hand at various new musical genres, including Disco Polka, Country Rap, and Demolition Rock, to humorous effect. The group's troubles begin to manifest, however, upon the replacement of singer A.C. with their manager's young protégé, Lick Broccoli.

Plot
The eponymous Raisins (A.C., Beebop, Stretch and Red), under the guidance of manager Rudy Bagaman, are on their way to a recording studio. Along the way they are approached by talent agent Leonard Limabean who offers to be their new manager but gets turned down twice. After arriving at the recording studio (which turns out to be a garage) and performing I Heard it Through the Grapevine, the Raisins grow disappointed at their lack of progress and hire Leonard, much to Rudy's sadness.

Under the guidance of Leonard and his young protégé Lick Broccoli, the Raisins try their hand at various new musical genres such as Disco Polka, Country Rap, and Demolition Rock, to humorous effect. While Beebop, Stretch and Red are enjoying their newfound success, A.C. grows annoyed and suspects that Leonard is "selling [them] out". Leonard eavesdrops on A.C. and allows Lick to crank up the special effects. While performing the Demolition Rock song, A.C.'s voice gets hoarse and he is escorted out of the studio by Leonard. As A.C. demands to be let back in, Leonard fakes Red's voice through an intercom, telling A.C. that the Raisins no longer want him. Leonard then forges a recording of A.C. deciding to leave the Raisins on his own. With A.C. absent, Leonard has Lick serve as the replacement lead singer.

As A.C. struggles to find a new job, he wanders around and reunites with Rudy at the Le Roach Lounge. Meanwhile the other three Raisins begin to miss A.C. and their own music, but as their contract with Leonard is still binding, they cannot leave. A.C. and Rudy watch a televised rock concert with Lick and the three Raisins. Rudy notices the chained Raisins in a state of pain and sets off to rescue them. The Raisins manage to break free, hop into Rudy's U-Lug van and escape the studio as Leonard chases them with their contract.

A.C. and the other Raisins reconcile at the Le Roach Lounge as they realize that Leonard had deceived them. Guests in the lounge notice the Raisins and have them sing I Heard it Through the Grapevine, attracting a large crowd. Leonard manages to find the Raisins and, with contract in hand, tries to coax Rudy into having them back, but Rudy incinerates the contract with his cigar ashes, nullifying it and reducing Leonard to tears.

With the Raisins having made a successful comeback, Lick Broccoli resorts to performing solos. In the epilogue, Lick is at a bar doing one such solo in front of Leonard, but fails to attract a wide audience as the other patrons pay more attention to a Raisins concert on TV. This angers Lick to the point where he plays his electric guitar and blows a fuse, shutting off everything in the bar save for the TV set. As the credits roll, Leonard and Lick argue while the patrons watch the concert on TV. After the credits, Rudy asks the Raisins if they want to do a television commercial.

Reception
Valerie Monroe of Entertainment Weekly gave the special a mediocre C+ review. She described it as "a lot like traditional Saturday-morning cartoon fare: harmless, but not especially enriching."

Releases
As was its predecessor, The Raisins: Sold Out! was released in VHS.

The special was released on DVD November 15, 2011. Included in the set is the original claymation special, Meet the Raisins! along with all 13 episodes of the animated series, The California Raisin Show and 4 original TV ads.

References

External links 

 
 

1988 television films
1988 films
American animated television films
American satirical films
1980s American television specials
American animated comedy films
CBS original programming
Film spin-offs
Animated films about music and musicians
American mockumentary films
Stop-motion animated short films
1988 television specials
1980s American animated films
Works based on advertisements